Argyris Chionis (22 April 1943 - 25 December 2011) was a Greek poet. In 1967, shortly after the military junta came to power, he emigrated to Paris.

Selected works
Alpheiós and Aréthousa

External links
Obituary

References

1943 births
2011 deaths
Writers from Athens
Modern Greek poets
Place of birth missing
20th-century Greek poets